Saatel is a railway station in the village of Saatel, Mecklenburg-Vorpommern, Germany. The station lies on the Velgast-Barth railway and the train services are operated by Deutsche Bahn.

Train services
The station is served by the following service:

regional service  (DB Regio Nordost) Barth - Kenz - Saatel - Velgast

References

Railway stations in Mecklenburg-Western Pomerania
Buildings and structures in Vorpommern-Rügen